The white-rumped sirystes (Sirystes albocinereus), is a species of bird in the family Tyrannidae. It was formerly considered conspecific with the sibilant sirystes.

Distribution and habitat
It is found from eastern Colombia to eastern Peru and western Brazil and northern Bolivia. Its natural habitat is subtropical or tropical moist lowland forests.

References

 Donegan, T.M. 2013b. Vocal variation and species limits in the genus Sirystes (Tyrannidae). Conservacion Colombiana 19: 11–30.
 

white-rumped sirystes
Birds of Colombia
Birds of the Amazon Basin
Birds of the Ecuadorian Amazon
Birds of the Peruvian Amazon
Birds of the Bolivian Amazon
white-rumped sirystes
white-rumped sirystes 
white-rumped sirystes